The 1997 Torneo Descentralizado was the 82nd season of the top category of Peruvian football (soccer). It was played by 14 teams. The national champion was Alianza Lima, their first title in 19 years.

Competition modus 
The national championship was divided into two half-year tournaments, the Torneo Apertura and the Torneo Clausura. Each was played on a round-robin basis. The winners of each would play for the national title in a playoff. However, since the same club won both tournaments, it won the national championship automatically.

Following-season Copa Libertadores berths went to the champion, as well as to the winner of a Liguilla (small league) featuring teams between second and seventh place on the aggregate table. This had a round-robin format, with the team obtaining the best results in matchups during the "regular season" playing at home. The runner-up would qualify for the Copa CONMEBOL. The bottom four teams on the aggregate table were relegated.

Teams

Torneo Apertura

Torneo Clausura

Finals
No finals were held after Alianza Lima won both the Apertura and Clausura tournaments, thus automatically obtaining the national title.

Aggregate table

Title

Liguilla Pre-Libertadores

Top scorers
Source: RSSSF
17 goals
 Ricardo Zegarra (Alianza Atlético)

External links
Peru 1997 season Details on RSSSF

Peruvian Primera División seasons
Peru
1997 in Peruvian football